Red Apple Falls is the sixth album by Smog (the alias of Bill Callahan), released in May 1997 on Drag City and re-released in Europe in 2001 by Domino.

Background
Red Apple Falls was recorded by Jim O'Rourke and Callahan, with assistance from Phil Bonnet. It is the first of two Smog records produced by O'Rourke, and Callahan's third team-up with O'Rourke. O'Rourke also plays bass guitar, piano, Hammond organ, hurdy-gurdy and drums on the album.

Songs
"Ex-Con" was released as a single. An early version of "Red Apples" first appeared on Callahan's first EP Floating in 1991, and was later covered by Cat Power for her album The Covers Record. "I Was a Stranger" was redone by Callahan for the 2000 EP 'Neath the Puke Tree.

Track listing

References

1997 albums
Bill Callahan (musician) albums
Drag City (record label) albums
Domino Recording Company albums
Albums produced by Jim O'Rourke (musician)